Giovanni Kyeremateng (born 20 February 1991) is an Italian footballer of Ghanaian descent who plays as a forward for Vastese.

Career

Youth career
Born in Arona, Piedmont, Giovanni started his career with his elder brother Basty at Internazionale. He played from Pulcini Regionali team in 2001–02 season to Allievi Nazionali under-17 team in 2007–08 season, winning the league champion with Giovanissimi Nazionali team in 2006. He also loaned to Allievi team of Pro Sesto in the first half of 2007–08 season along with Cristiano Biraghi, Marco Puntoriere and Domenico Maiese. He returned to Inter Allievi Nazionali in January 2008 and scored a goal in the round 16 of the league playoffs.

Monza
In 2008–09 season, Inter loaned some players to Monza, namely Paolo Campinoti, Nicolò De Cesare, Luca D'Errico, D.Maiese, Mirko Santoro, Davide Tremolada, Stefano Tresoldi, Maximiliano Uggè, Niccolò Scaccabarozzi and Francesco Poltero  (since January). Kyeremateng also reunited with Giovanissimi Scudetto winning teammate Stefan Nenadović at Monza. He was bought outright by Monza in August 2009 for free 

In 2010–11 season, due to injury and suspension (1 game due to hire two agents at the same time), he only played 3 matches so far (2 in the cup.) He also played a few matches as unused bench in September.

On 31 January 2011 he was loaned to Ascoli, in exchange with Simone Masini. He wore no.20 shirt. However, he only able to play in the under-20 team in the Campionato Nazionale Primavera.

On 11 January 2012 he left for Montichiari along with Houssem Chemali and Jeffrey Senou.

On 10 November 2012, he signed a contract with Treviso.

On 17 January 2023, Kyeremateng moved to Serie D club Vastese.

Honours
Inter youth
Campionato Giovanissimi Nazionali: 2006

Monza youth
Campionato Nazionale Dante Berretti Runner-up: 2009

References

External links
 Football.it Profile 
 
 Monza Profile 
 
 

1991 births
People from Arona, Piedmont
Footballers from Piedmont
Sportspeople from the Province of Novara
Italian people of Ghanaian descent
Italian sportspeople of African descent
Living people
Italian footballers
Association football forwards
A.C. Monza players
Ascoli Calcio 1898 F.C. players
A.C. Montichiari players
Treviso F.B.C. 1993 players
A.C. Bellaria Igea Marina players
Calcio Foggia 1920 players
Imolese Calcio 1919 players
Rende Calcio 1968 players
A.C. Trento 1921 players
S.S. Matelica Calcio 1921 players
U.S. Savoia 1908 players
S.S.C. Giugliano players
Vastese Calcio 1902 players
Serie C players
Serie D players